Konalga is a village in the Bitlis District of Bitlis Province in Turkey. The village is populated by Kurds of the Dimilî tribe and had a population of 26 in 2021.

The hamlet of Karaca is attached to the village.

References

Villages in Bitlis District
Kurdish settlements in Bitlis Province